In algebraic geometry, the Virasoro conjecture states that a certain generating function encoding Gromov–Witten invariants of a smooth projective variety is fixed by an action of half of the Virasoro algebra. The Virasoro conjecture is named after theoretical physicist Miguel Ángel Virasoro. 
proposed the Virasoro conjecture as a generalization of Witten's conjecture.  gave a survey of the Virasoro conjecture.

References

Algebraic geometry
Conjectures
Unsolved problems in geometry